Osman Saleh Mohammed was the first Minister of Education for Eritrea following Independence, serving in that position from 1993 to 2007.  He has oversaw the transition from the revolutionary EPLF school system to a national education system.

In April 2007, he was moved to head the Ministry of Foreign Affairs.

See also
 List of current foreign ministers

References

External links

 AfDevInfo

Living people
Foreign ministers of Eritrea
Education ministers of Eritrea
Year of birth missing (living people)
People's Front for Democracy and Justice politicians